Keshawn or Keyshawn is an African American male  given name. Notable people with the name include:

 Keyshawn Johnson (born 1972), American football player
 Keshawn Martin (born 1990), American football wide receiver
 Ke'Shawn Vaughn (born 1997), American football player

See also